Suillus cavipoides is a bolete mushroom in the genus Suillus native to China. Initially described as Boletinus cavipoides, it was transferred by Wang and Yao to the genus Suillus in a 2004 nomenclatural revision of several Chinese boletes.

References

External links

cavipoides
Fungi described in 1892
Fungi of China